Kinyala is an administrative ward in the Rungwe District of the Mbeya Region of Tanzania. In 2016 the Tanzania National Bureau of Statistics report there were 14,185 people in the ward, from 12,871 in 2012.

Villages and hamlets 
The ward has 6 villages, and 40 hamlets.

 Igembe
 Igembe
 Ikuti A
 Ikuti B
 Kipili
 Songwe
 katumba
 Isumba
 Igembe
 Isumba
 Itebe
 Kibole
 Kikuyu
 Kipande
 Chunya
 Igwila
 Ilala
 Kilambo
 Kipande
 Mbeswe
 Kisoko
 Ilunga
 Kisoko
 Mete
 Ngeke
 Njole
 Salima
 Lubigi
 Ikukisya
 Itete
 Kakindo
 Lubigi
 Magamba
 Mbegele
 Moto
 Lukata
 Ikoga
 Ipugu
 Itete
 Katumba
 Kibanja
 Lubala
 Mpombo
 Ndola
 Ngologo
 Nkebe

References 

Wards of Mbeya Region